Mirza Mu'izz-ud-Din Beg Muhammad Khan (10 May 1661 – 11 February 1713), more commonly known as Jahandar Shah (lit. ' The owner of the World' ), was the ninth Mughal Emperor who ruled for a brief period in 1712–1713. He was the son of Bahadur Shah (Shah Alam), and the grandson of Alamgir (Aurangzeb). Jahandar Shah ruled for only eleven months before being deposed. In his reign, the Deccan Subah was made almost independent by Zulfiqar Khan Nusrat Jang. Jahandar Shah was deposed by the badishahgar(king-makers), and succeeded by his nephew Farrukhsiyar in 1713 CE.

Early life
Prince Jahandar Shah was born on 10 May 1661 in Deccan Subah to Prince Muazzam, later Emperor Bahadur Shah I. His mother was Nizam Bai, the daughter of Fatehyawar Jang, a noble from Hyderabad.

Jahandar Shah was appointed as governor of Balkh in 1671 by his grandfather, Aurangzeb. When their father died on 27 February 1712, both Jahandar and his brother, Azim-ush-Shan, declared themselves emperors and battled for succession. Azim was killed on 17 March 1712, after which Jahandar Shah ruled for an additional eleven months. Before ascending the throne, Jahandar Shah sailed around the Indian Ocean and was a very prosperous trader. He was also appointed subahdar of Sindh. He fathered three sons, including Aziz-ud-Din, who reigned as an emperor between 1754 and 1759.

Reign

Jahandar Shah led a frivolous life, and his court was often enlivened by dancing and entertainment. He chose a favourite wife, Lal Kunwar, who was a mere dancing girl before her elevation to the position of Queen Consort. Together they shocked the Mughal Empire and were even opposed by Aurangzeb's surviving daughter, Zeenat-un-Nissa.

His authority was rejected by the third Nawab of the Carnatic, Muhammed Saadatullah Khan I, who killed De Singh of Orchha, primarily due to the Nawab's belief that he was the righteous commander of the Gingee Fort. Khan began a smear campaign referring to Jahandar Shah as an usurper to the Mughal throne. To further strengthen his authority, Jahandar Shah sent gifts to the Ottoman Sultan Ahmad III.

Marriages
Jahandar Shah's first wife was the daughter of Mirza Mukarram Khan Safavi. The marriage took place on 13 October 1676. After her death he married her niece, Sayyid-un-Nisa Begum, the daughter of Rustam Mirza. The marriage took place on 30 August 1684. Qazi Abu Sa'id united them in the presence of Emperor Aurangzeb, and Prince Muazzam (future Bahadur Shah I). The marriage was consummated on 18 September. Sayyid-un-Nisa Begum was presented with jewels worth 67,000 rupees. The celebrations were supervised by Princess Zinat-un-nissa Begum.

His third wife was a Rajput Princess, Anup Bai. She was the mother of Prince Muhammad Aziz-ud-din Mirza, born on 6 June 1699. She died at Delhi on 17 April 1735, nineteen years before her son's accession to the throne as Emperor Alamgir II. His fourth wife was Lal Kunwar, the daughter of Khasusiyat Khan. Jahandar Shah was very fond of her, and after his accession to the throne, he gave her the title Imtiyaz Mahal.

Death

He was defeated in the battle at Agra on 10 January 1713 by Farrukhsiyar, his nephew and the second son of Azim-ush-Shan, with the support of the Sayyid Brothers. He fled to Delhi where he was captured and handed over to the new emperor, who confined him along with Lal Kunwar. He lived in confinement for a month, until 11 February 1713, when professional stranglers were sent to murder him. Jahandar Shah's body was paraded around Delhi in parts, hanging upside down from two elephants.

Full Title 
His full title was Shahanshah-i-Ghazi Abu'l Fath Mu'izz-ud-Din Muhammad Jahandar Shah Sahib-i-Qiran Padshah-i-Jahan (Khuld Aramgah).

Coins
Jahandar Shah reintroduced couplets and issued coins in gold, silver, and copper. Two couplets i.e. Abu al-Fateh and Sahab Qiran were used. Copper coins were issued in both weight standard i.e. 20 grams and 14 grams.

Notes

References

External links
Coin Gallery
Mughal dynasty

Mughal emperors
Shah, Jahandar
Shah, Jahandar
Murdered Indian monarchs
18th-century murdered monarchs
1713 murders in Asia
18th-century murders in India